The Army Legal Services Branch (ALS) is a branch of the Adjutant-General's Corps (AGC) in the British Army. Before 1992, the branch existed as the independent Army Legal Corps (ALC).

History
Many of the functions of the ALS were once carried out by the Judge Advocate General (JAG) whose own origins can be traced back to medieval times. Following World War I, the growing demand for legal services within the army led in 1923 to the creation of the Military Department of the Office of the Judge Advocate General.

The Directorate of Army Legal Services was formed from the JAG's office on 1 October 1948 and would go on to receive full corps status as the Army Legal Corps on 1 November 1978. It was always the smallest corps in the Army. On 6 April 1992, the corps became the Army Legal Services Branch of the Adjutant General's Corps, but retains a separate identity and its own cap badge.

Activities
Army Legal Services Branch is a group of qualified solicitors, barristers and Scottish advocates providing legal support to the Army.

List of directors general 

The head of the Army Legal Services Branch is its Director. The Director General holds the rank of major general.

See also
RAF Legal Branch
Judge Advocate General (United Kingdom)

References

External links
Army Legal Services

British administrative corps
Legal organisations based in the United Kingdom
United Kingdom military law
Adjutant General's Corps
Military units and formations established in 1978
United Kingdom